KKS Pro-Basket Kutno, for sponsorship reasons named Polfarmex Kutno, is a Polish professional basketball team based in Kutno. The team currently plays in the I Liga, the second tier league in Poland.

History
Kutno was promoted to the PLK after the club won the I Liga in 2014.

Honours
I Liga
Champions (1): 2013–14

Season by season

Notable players

 Patrik Auda  
 Dardan Berisha  
 Kevin Johnson
 Kamil Łączyński
 Maksim Salash
 Mariusz Bacik
 Michal Batka
 Mateusz Bartosz

References

Basketball teams in Poland
Kutno